Crépy is a commune in the Pas-de-Calais department in the Hauts-de-France region of France.

Geography
A typical rural agricultural village situated some 20 miles (32 km) east of Montreuil-sur-Mer on the D71 road.  The limestone hill located south of wood is managed by the Nature Conservatory. The many hedges in the village have created an ecological network, essential for  wildlife. The preservation of these hedges and the conservation of grasslands is vital. Some rare species breed in the area.

History
Site of a German V1 rocket launch-pad in 1944.

Places of interest
 The sixteenth century church of St. Germain

Population

See also
Communes of the Pas-de-Calais department

References

Communes of Pas-de-Calais
Artois